NBG may refer to:

Namibian Black German, a pidgin variant of the German language native to Namibia
Natal Border Guard, a military unit of the Colony of Natal during the Anglo-Zulu War
National Bank of Georgia
National Bank of Greece
Naval Air Station Joint Reserve Base New Orleans, by IATA airport code
NBG Radio Network, defunct American radio network based in Portland, Oregon
von Neumann–Bernays–Gödel set theory in mathematics
Nibong LRT station, Singapore, by LRT station abbreviation
Nordic Battle Group
Nuremberg, a city in Bavaria, Germany
Non-binary gender, a gender identity (also abbreviated as "NB")
Natural burial ground, a cemetery dedicated to natural burial